Four Stones or Fourstones may refer to:

 A former name of Duddo Five Stones, a stone circle in Northumberland, England
 Fourstones, a village in Northumberland, England
 Fourstones railway station, Northumberland, England
 Four Stones for Kanemitsu, a 1973 American short documentary
 The Great Stone of Fourstones, a glacial deposit on the Lancashire/North Yorkshire border, England

See also
 Fhourstones, a computer science benchmark